Quentin Lawrence (6 November 1920, in Gravesend – 9 March 1979, in Halifax, Yorkshire) was an English film and television director. He worked a long time for ATV.

An article about TV directors in The Guardian said he was "noted for the precision of his camerawork."

Selected filmography
 The Trollenberg Terror (1958)
 Cash on Demand (1962)
 Edgar Wallace Mysteries : (Playback episode) (1962) 
 The Man Who Finally Died (1963)
 We Shall See (1964)
 The Secret of Blood Island (1965)

Producer
 The Ghosts of Motley Hall'' (1977)

References

External links

Quentin Lawrence at Letterbox DVD
Quentin Lawrence at BFI

1920 births
1979 deaths
People from Gravesend, Kent
English film directors
British television directors